Emilia Krakowska (born 20 February 1940 in Poznań) is Polish entertainer, film and theater actress.

Biography 
She graduated from the high school in Drezdenko and the Theatre Academy in Warsaw (1963). She worked in the following theaters: Powszechny in Warsaw (1964-1968), National (1968-1978), Contemporary in Warsaw (1978-1985) and Variety in Warsaw (1985-1991) and Teatr Powszechny in. Jan Kochanowski in Radom in 2008; Wroclaw Comedy Theatre, Drama Theatre; Alexander Hungarian Bialystok and the New Theatre in Slupsk.

She consolidated her film actress career in a number of television series. In the 1980s, she was a member of the National Council for Culture. She belonged to a group of actors who boycotted the Polish stage after the introduction of martial law in 1981..

In 2005, during the X Festival of Stars in Międzyzdroje she participated in the Promenade of Stars.

In 2013 she was rewarded by the Polish section of the International Association of Theatre Critics.

Private life 
She was married four times, and is the mother of two daughters from the first and second marriage.

Filmography 
 2013: Na krawędzi – Janina Orpik, matka Marty
 2013: Lekarze – Władysława „Sophie" Żera (odc. 25)
 od 2012: Barwy szczęścia – Antonina
 2012-2014: Galeria – Aniela
 2009: Ojciec Mateusz – Alicja Lendo (odc. 16 „Wycieczka")
 2007-2008: Hela w opałach – Krystyna Trojańska, była teściowa Heli
 2005:   Magiczne drzewo – babcia Schulz
 2004 – 2009: Pierwsza miłość – Natalia Strońska-Radosz
 2003: Ciało – Babcia Wanda
 1999 – 2007, 2009: Na dobre i na złe – Gabriela Kalita
 1993: Czterdziestolatek. 20 lat później – inżynier Halina Małecka-Klecka
 1985: Chrześniak – Zosia
 1980: Tylko Kaśka – sąsiadka Okońska
 1977: Nie zaznasz spokoju – Krystyna
 1976: Brunet wieczorową porą – nauczycielka oprowadzająca dzieci po muzeum
 1974: Ziemia obiecana – Gitla
 1973: Droga – Stefa (odc. 2 „Numer próbny")
 1973: Chłopi – Jagna Pacześ (Borynowa)
 1973: Jak to się robi – Alina Kubacka, kierowniczka Domu Pracy Twórczej „Muza"
 1972: Chłopi – Jagna
 1972: Wesele – Marysia, siostra panny młodej
 1972: Kopernik – żona złodzieja Kacpra (odc. 3)
 1971: Seksolatki – Wanda, partnerka Marka Kowalika
 1970: Brzezina – Malina – wiejska dziewczyna
 1964: Pingwin – dziewczyna w budce telefoniczne
 1964: Nieznany – pielęgniarka

Polish dubbing 
 2009: Hannah Montana: Film – Babcia Ruby

External links 
 
 Emilia Krakowska w bazie filmweb.pl
 Emilia Krakowska w bazie  filmpolski.pl
 Emilia Krakowska w bazie e-teatr.pl
 Emilia Krakowska w bazie stopklatka.pl
 Emilia Krakowska na zdjęciach w bazie Filmoteki Narodowej „Fototeka”
 Emilia Krakowska w bazie Akademii Polskiego Filmu

Polish film actresses
Polish television actresses
Polish stage actresses
1940 births
Living people
Actors from Poznań
Aleksander Zelwerowicz National Academy of Dramatic Art in Warsaw alumni
Recipient of the Meritorious Activist of Culture badge